Saqarchin (also Romanized as Saqarchīn) is a village in Juqin Rural District, in the Central District of Shahriar County, Tehran Province, Iran. At the 2006 census, its population was 704, in 183 families.

References 

Populated places in Shahriar County